James Hall (dates unknown) was an English first-class cricketer who played for Cambridge Town Club in the 1820s and 1830s. He is recorded in 12 matches, totalling 151 runs with a highest score of 39 and holding 5 catches.

References

Bibliography
 

English cricketers
English cricketers of 1787 to 1825
English cricketers of 1826 to 1863
Cambridge Town Club cricketers
Year of birth unknown
Year of death unknown